National Highway 61 (NH 61) is a  National Highway in India connecting Bhiwandi in Maharashtra to Nirmal in Telangana. The route of this national highway was extended from Nirmal to Jagtial in the state of Telangana. NH-61 runs through states of Maharashtra and Telangana covering a distance of 758 km.

Route 

Maharashtra
Bhiwandi - Kalyan - Murbad - Ghatghar - Ale - Ahmadnagar -Pathardi - Yeli - Kharwandi - Gevrai - Pachegaon - Majalgaon - Pathri - Parbhani - Basmath - Ardhapur - Bhokar - Telangana border.

Telangana
Maharashtra Border - Bhainsa - Nirmal - Khanapur - Mallapuram - Raikal - Jagtial.

Junctions  
 
  Terminal near Bhiwandi.
 at Ale Phata (Pune District)
  at Belhe (Pune District)
  at Nirmal.
  Terminal near Jagtial.

See also 
 List of National Highways in India
 List of National Highways in India by state

References

External links 

 NH 61 on OpenStreetMap

National highways in India
National Highways in Maharashtra
National Highways in Telangana